Paul de Cordon (born in 1908 in Toulouse - died in 1998 in Paris) was a French photographer known for his photographs of the circus and the Crazy Horse Saloon. He was also recognized for his portraits and his nudes for which he was, in 1964, considered one of the greatest photographers in the world together with Guy Bourdin and Lucien Clergue. He produced portraits of many personalities such as Johnny Hallyday, Gilbert Bécaud, Mireille Darc, Jacques Brel, Fernand Raynaud, Anna Karina, Samy Davis Jr., Jeanne Moreau, Steve McQueen and his long-time friends, Daniel Sorano and Jacques Dufilho as well as Gonzague Saint Bris with whom he was very close  and who nicknamed him “The Toulouse-Lautrec of photography’’. In 1961 he participated alongside Edouard Boubat, Agnès Varda, Man Ray, Frank Horvat, William Klein and Robert Doisneau in the mythical exhibition "Metamorphosis and invention of a face" around the portrait of Anne- Marie Edvina. He was also an equestrian, fashion and advertising photographer, notably for Nikon and Beaulieu. He collaborated with Europe 1 in the years 1960/70. Paul de Cordon even tried his hand at television by co-presenting the Cirques du Monde program with Jean Richard on channel A2. His works are present in prestigious collections such as those of the National Library of France (BNF), the Rodin museum and W.M. Hunt.

Early years
Paul de Cordon was born in Toulouse. His father, Comte Pierre de Cordon, was a cavalry officer; his mother, Marthe de Boyer-Montegut, a cultivated, book-loving woman, was the daughter of Paul de Boyer- Montégut, who, for many years, was mayor of Cugnaux, near Toulouse, where he owned the château de Maurens.
It was in Maurens that Paul de Cordon, as a child, spent his holidays and it was there that he discovered horses which were to become one of the great passions of his life. His grandfather Boyer-Montegut was what was the French call, a “Homme de cheval’’ whose four-in-hand teams were renowned in Toulouse and across the region. As a child, he also lived for several years in Mainz (Germany), where his father was stationed after the First World War. It was around this time that he started taking pictures with a small camera, a gift from his parents. He learned the basic techniques from an old German photographer during long hours spent in his shop.
It was also in Germany where his attraction to the circus was born. The large travelling circuses, like Althoff, then crisscrossed the country with quality shows and numerous animals.
As a teenager, he was a boarder in a Paris school. He was then able to discover a very intense artistic and cultural life thanks to his aunt, the Marquise du Crozet, his mother's elder sister. He attended performances by Serge de Diaghilev's Ballets Russes which, after the war, came on tour every year to Paris. He went to the theater and visited exhibitions with his first cousin, Aimar du Crozet, who was much older than him and took him "under his wing" to serve as his guide to the Paris of the 1920s. Aimar du Crozet also had a passion for horses and races. He was the owner of Master Bob, who won the 1924 Paris Grand Steeple Chase * and who became so famous an athlete that he is mentioned by Ernest Hemingway at the start of his book ‘’Death in the Afternoon’’.
After his studies Paul de Cordon enlisted in the 18th Dragons cavalry regiment. More than a true military vocation, it was once again the love of horses that motivated him.
At that time almost all the cavalry regiments were mounted and each maintained and trained horses to enter in show jumping events and steeple chases, in which both officers and noncommissioned officers participated. In the 1930s, he thus took part in dozens of races on tracks in France and across Europe.
After the 18th Dragons he was assigned to the 2nd Hussards, in Tarbes, the “Chamborant’’, where he continued his favorite activities; training and riding horses. By an amusing coincidence, his great-grandmother on his mother’s side was Louise de Séganville, daughter of Colonel Baron de Séganville who had been the regiment’s commanding officer between 1813 and 1815.
It was at the 2nd Hussards that he had two encounters that would mean a lot in his life. He befriended Jacques Dufilho who, after interrupting his studies in dental prosthesis, had signed an eighteen-month enlistment contract. * Dufilho will become one of his dearest friends when they meet again after the war. There he also meets Jean Devaivre who completed his military service at “Chamborant’’. Jean Devaivre then went to work in cinema and became a great director, it was he who enabled Paul de Cordon, after the war, to embark on a new life.
Devaivre was not only a cineaste but also an authentic character actor: working during the occupation for the German group Continental Films in Paris, he was at the same time a very active member of the French resistance. His exploits include flying from the Nevers region to London clandestinely after having made the journey from Paris to Nevers in the afternoon... by bicycle. Bertrand Tavernier's film “Laissez-passer’’ is directly inspired by his life, as recounted in his autobiography, “Action’’.
In 1939, the 2nd Hussards broke up into reconnaissance groups which took part in the 1940 battles on the Ardennes front, * Paul de Cordon participated in these actions in a mounted squadron and was taken prisoner by the Germans. He ended his captivity in the fortress of Colditz where he was liberated by the US military on April 16, 1945.
In 1945 he married Dilette de Rigaud de Vaudreuil and they had three children. He remained in the army for a few more months and was assigned to the Cadre Noir in Saumur.

Second life
After a few months in Saumur, he decided to leave the army. In 1947 Jean Devaivre who had just directed “La dame d’onze heure" with Paul Meurisse, a film of astonishing modernity, offered him a job as his assistant and Paul de Cordon accepted.
He was Devaivre’s first assistant director for “La ferme des sept péchés" ( he was also the stuntman for scenes on horseback) and for "Vendetta en Camargue" where he reunited with Jacques Dufilho. At that time, in addition to being a stuntman he was also an acrobatic and burlesque dancer.
At the beginning of the 1950s, Paul de Cordon decided to become a professional photographer. He set up a studio in Paris and started developing relations with various clients in the press, advertising agencies, fashion designers, show business ...
He also began to develop a large-scale personal project on the circus and the Crazy Horse Saloon cabaret. He spent many nights with his camera at Medrano, at the Bouglione brothers' Cirque d’Hiver and at the Crazy Horse Saloon. Until the 1990s he also traveled the world to visit
circuses and bring back photos. Over these years, he has developed close ties with the great dynasties of the circus ring : Schumann, Rancy, Knie, Gruss, Bouglione, Houcke, Medrano, Fratellini etc ... In all these families the horse occupied a central role in their performances. This equestrian culture and Paul de Cordon’s experience as a horseman facilitated and consolidated links with all these artists and strengthened their mutual confidence and friendship. His taste for spectacle, ballets and theater helped him to appreciate and better understand the work represented by all these artists. During these years, in addition to his work as a photographer, Paul de Cordon wrote a lot about the circus and this is how the Swiss magazine “L’Année Hippique" often published his articles on horses and circus equestrians.

Circus instants
"Faced with this obstinate pursuit of the perfect gesture, I understood that I was living there what I had always sought: a circus moment". “Instants de Cirque’’ is the title of Paul de Cordon's most famous book, which brings together a selection of images taken over more than thirty years and which he considered particularly representative. The book was edited by Bernard de Fallois who was also a circus lover and an admirer of Paul de Cordon's photos.
This book, published in 1977 by Le Chêne, allows us, with hindsight, to better understand the originality and peculiarity of Paul de Cordon’s photos. The circus is a subject that has greatly inspired photographers attracted by the spectacular and flashy nature of the circus ring. But there is no flashiness in the photos that appear there, they are intimate, shrouded in mystery, charged with a secret emotion. A photo of Gilbert Houcke with his tiger Prince illustrates their peculiarity well: there is no circus ring nor lights, we are backstage, the tamer wears a worn bathrobe, there is a sort of semi-darkness which brings out the eye of the tiger and his outstretched paw, claws extended, which he offers to the caress of the human hand. Few images make you feel with as much force the reciprocal respect and the affection that there can be between a wild beast and his tamer but also the formidable danger, the courage it takes to face it and the amount of work and humility that represent a successful act. This photo may not be what people call a circus photo, but it illustrates what Paul de Cordon called the “instant de cirque’’. Paul de Cordon had a great admiration for tamers and loved wild animals. He liked to enter their cages, accompanied by the tamer of course. He also
chose to include on the jacket of his book, a photo of himself with the lionesses of Georges Marck, wearing the uniform of the 2nd Hussards. The photo was shot by his brother, Benoît de Cordon.
Paul de Cordon was passionately fond of the circus, but he did not like being labeled as a circus photographer because the documentary aspect often linked to that genre and most often sought after by circophiles, was of no interest to him. What he was interested in and what he wanted to express in his photos was, he said, “the peculiarity of an artist, the very core of his art’’. He had an exceptional talent for capturing what others didn't always see, which is probably why so many circus performers wanted to be photographed by him.

Crazy Horse Saloon
Paul de Cordon met Alain Bernardin at the very beginning of the Crazy Horse Saloon.The old coal cellar on the avenue George V had just been converted into a micro cabaret. The former antique dealer who invented the most cerebral strip show in the world and the recently converted cavalry officer shared a common aversion for rules and conventions and were both attracted to show business and pretty women. The friendship between them that lasted many years was punctuated with sulking. They both had a touch of dandyism and a taste for beautiful fabrics and bespoke suits which led them to share a Russian tailor before he emigrated to Hollywood to dress movie stars. Paul de Cordon took hundreds of photos at the Paris cabaret which illustrate the long history of the place . There are also many images shot in the dressing rooms. They are more intimate, devoid of any sort of voyeurism and translate the total confidence of the dancers.This part of his work is less well known as it reveals a different face of his talent.

Portraits
Paul de Cordon is not considered a portrait photographer and yet, one realizes when looking at his work, that he also excelled in this particular art as evidenced by portraits of his friends the Gruss brothers, Alexis and André, of the clown Pipo and of Jean Houcke. His striking portrait of the actor Jacques Dufilho, in a black leather coat captures all the austerity and intelligence of this comedian. His portraits of pop stars are of interest in that they totally ignore the canons of the yé-yé aesthetic
imposed by the iconic music magazine « Salut les copains » (Hello mates).
Paul de Cordon worked regularly for advertising, fashion, and the press.
In advertising he worked for Nikon and Beaulieu shooting their ads and catalogues for several years.
In the press he began working for horse magazines. During the 60’s he did many jobs for the music press and for record companies including photos of pop groups, yé-yé stars, or even latin music groups (Chaussettes noires, Johnny Hallyday, Hugues Aufray, Françoise Hardy, Sylvie Vartan and los Machucambos).
He was also involved in fashion photography and participated for several years in the July fashion show marathons when Paris studios were overbooked for night photoshoots.

3 zebras
In the contemporary world, images are everywhere, and some photos are more famous than their photographers. Everyone knows “Le baîser de l’hôtel de Ville’’ by Robert Doisneau, “Death of a republican soldier’’ by Robert Capa, or “Dovima and the elephants" by Avedon. Paul de Cordon most famous photo, undoubtedly, is “Three zebras’’ which has been presented in all his exhibitions and appears, of course, in Instants de Cirque although it was not shot in a circus but at the Amsterdam Zoo in 1957. This photo was published worldwide, including in the American edition of Life in March 1962.
Paul de Cordon died in March 1998 in Paris, two years before his wife, Dilette, who had accompanied him to circuses around the world. They are buried in Verneuil in the Nièvre. Paul de Cordon is the grandfather of Pierre-Elie de Pibrac, a photographer known in
particular for his work on the Paris Opera. Photos from his book “In Situ’’ (2014) have been exhibited in France and around the world. It was thanks to his grandfather with whom he was very close, that Pierre-Elie de Pibrac developed his vocation for photography.

Books by Paul de Cordon
 Girls of the Crazy Horse Saloon Verlagspresse 1971
 Instants de Cirque Edition du chêne 1977
 Le Cadre Noir Julliard 1981

References

1908 births
1998 deaths
French photographers
Artists from Toulouse
Artists from Mainz